"Baila Baila Baila" is a song by Puerto Rican singer Ozuna, released as the lead single on January 5, 2019, from his third studio album Nibiru. It was later remixed, first in a MamWali version with Ala Jaza and another version featuring Daddy Yankee, J Balvin, Farruko and Anuel AA, released on April 25. The latter remix helped the song reach new chart peaks in several countries, including number 69 on the US Billboard Hot 100. The single was certified platinum for moving one million units in United States alone.

Composition
The song is about a woman who goes to a club and dances with her friends to forget a boyfriend that she broke up with.

Remix

Ozuna performed the song at the 2019 Billboard Latin Music Awards on April 25, accompanied by Daddy Yankee, J Balvin and Anuel AA.

Charts

Weekly charts

Year-end charts

Certifications

See also
List of Billboard number-one Latin songs of 2019

References

2019 singles
2019 songs
Ozuna (singer) songs
Daddy Yankee songs
J Balvin songs
Anuel AA songs
Spanish-language songs
Songs written by Ozuna (singer)
Farruko songs